Fudbalski klub Tuzla City, formerly known as Fudbalski klub Sloga Simin Han, is a professional football club based in Simin Han, Tuzla, Bosnia and Herzegovina. The club plays in the Premier League of Bosnia and Herzegovina, which is the top tier of football in the country.

History
The club was founded in 1955. In the 2017–18 season, the club made history getting crowned champion of the First League of FBiH and getting promoted to the Premier League of Bosnia and Herzegovina for the first time in its history. On 18 June 2018, it changed the club name from FK Sloga Simin Han to FK Tuzla City. In the 2018–19 season, its first ever Premier League season, Tuzla City finished on 10th place, narrowly escaping relegation. In the 2019–20 season, the club finished on a great 5th place, even almost qualifying for the 2020–21 UEFA Europa League First qualifying round, but the season was ended abruptly due to the ongoing COVID-19 pandemic in Bosnia and Herzegovina and the club, by default, finished in 5th.

Honours

Domestic

League
Premier League of Bosnia and Herzegovina:
Runners-up (1): 2021–22 
First League of the Federation of Bosnia and Herzegovina: 
Winners (1): 2017–18
Second League of the Federation of Bosnia and Herzegovina:
Winners (2): 2014–15 , 2015–16

European record

Summary

Matches

Players

Current squad

Players with multiple nationalities

  Malcolm Barcola
  Samir Burić
  Alassane Diaby
  Allan Eleouet
  Nebojša Gavrić
  Mirsad Hasanović
  Adrian Mendeš
  Petar Mišić

Club officials

Coaching staff

Other information

Managerial history
 Milenko Bošnjaković (1 July 2014 – 1 December 2016)
 Nermin Bašić (8 January 2017 – 4 June 2017)
 Darko Vojvodić (7 June 2017 – 29 January 2018)
 Ratko Ninković (30 January 2018 – 26 March 2018)
 Mensur Dedić (interim) (28 March 2018 – 1 June 2018)
 Slobodan Starčević (12 June 2018 – 25 February 2019)
 Mirza Varešanović (26 February 2019 – 26 May 2019)
 Milenko Bošnjaković (29 May 2019 – 29 September 2019)
 Elvir Baljić (2 October 2019 – 9 March 2020)
 Zlatan Nalić (11 March 2020 – 16 October 2020)
 Nermin Bašić (19 October 2020 – 31 December 2020)
 Husref Musemić (7 January 2021 – 10 April 2022)
 Selver Ahmetović (interim) (10 April 2022 – 31 May 2022)
 Dragan Jović (1 June 2022 – 28 November 2022)
 Milenko Bošnjaković (19 December 2022 – present)

References

External links
 

 
1955 establishments in Bosnia and Herzegovina
Association football clubs established in 1955
Football clubs in Bosnia and Herzegovina